Morta (died in 1263) was Queen of Lithuania (1253–1262) upon the accession of her husband, King Mindaugas. Very little is known about her life. Probably, Morta was Mindaugas' second wife as Vaišvilkas, the eldest son of Mindaugas, was already a mature man active in international politics when Morta's sons were still young and dependent on the parents. After her death, Mindaugas married her sister, the wife of Daumantas. In revenge, Daumantas allied with Treniota and assassinated Mindaugas and two of Morta's sons in 1263.

Origin
Her pagan name is unknown. The only clue into her origin or birthplace is a short mention in the comments following the treaty signed in 1219 between the Lithuanian dukes and Galicia–Volhynia. It says that Mindaugas killed many members of the Bulaičiai family, including Vismantas whose wife Mindaugas took for himself. The Hypatian Codex elaborates that Vismantas was killed in 1251–1253 during an attack against Vykintas' castle (often assumed to be in Tverai). It is generally assumed that Morta was Vismantas' wife. Lithuanian historian Edvardas Gudavičius analyzed toponyms and determined that the Bulaičiai family most likely hailed from the Šiauliai region. Based on this extrapolation, residents of Šiauliai call the city home of Morta. 

In the 16th-century Preussische Chronik, it is mentioned that Morta was actually from Sweden since at the time it was a common practice for pagan rulers who were seeking the throne to marry Christian brides from foreign countries. However, historians consider this claim to be untrue, suggesting that German chroniclers only thought so because they could not believe that a Lithuanian pagan could be such a fierce defender of Western Christianity.

Life
Her life is briefly described in the Livonian Rhymed Chronicle. The Chronicle paints an image of a capable woman who advised her husband in political affairs and even provides several colorful dialogues between her and Mindaugas. According to the Chronicle, she supported Lithuanian conversion to Christianity, opposed Treniota, and defended the Christians when Mindaugas relapsed to his pagan faith. Taking into account her support to the Christians and the fact that her pagan name is unknown, Rimvydas Petrauskas proposed that perhaps Morta was baptized earlier than Mindaugas (he was baptized  by the Bishop of Chełmno).

Family

The written sources contain little information on Morta's family and it is not entirely clear how many children she had. Two sons, Replys and Gerstukas, are mentioned once in an act dated August 7, 1261. The act, by which Mindaugas granted all of Selonia to the Livonian Order, could be a medieval forgery by the Order. According to the Hypatian Codex, two sons, Rūklys and Rupeikis, were assassinated together with Mindaugas in 1263. This is the only information available and historians disagree on whether these were the same two sons, whose names were distorted by medieval scribes, or whether there were four sons.

References

13th-century births
1260s deaths
Grand Duchesses of Lithuania
13th-century Lithuanian people 
13th-century Lithuanian women